Pamela Mary Morse (née Clarke,  – November 9, 2009) was a British and Canadian agricultural statistician who worked for many years as a researcher for the Statistical Research Service of Agriculture Canada.

Education and career
Pamela Clarke earned a master's degree in mathematics from the University of Oxford in 1949. She worked at the Rothamsted Experimental Station from 1947 to 1949, for the National Institute for Research in Dairying from 1949 to 1957, and for the United Kingdom Atomic Energy Authority in 1957 and 1958.

In 1958, she became a research scientist for the Statistical Research Service of the Canada Department of Agriculture (later, Agriculture Canada), where she would remain for the rest of her career. She married Eric Morse in 1959, and used the name Morse for her subsequent publications.

Recognition
In 1984, the American Statistical Association named Morse a Fellow of the American Statistical Association.

Selected publications

References

1920s births
2009 deaths
British statisticians
Canadian statisticians
Women statisticians
Alumni of the University of Oxford
Fellows of the American Statistical Association
British emigrants to Canada